During World War II, Operation Grenade was the crossing of the Roer river between Roermond and Düren by the U.S. Ninth Army, commanded by Lieutenant General William Hood Simpson, in February 1945, which marked the beginning of the Allied invasion of Germany.

On 9 February, the U.S. Ninth Army—operating under Field Marshal Bernard Montgomery's Anglo-Canadian 21st Army Group since the Battle of the Bulge—was to cross the Roer and link up with the Canadian First Army, under Lieutenant-General Harry Crerar, coming from the Nijmegen area of the Netherlands in Operation Veritable, which had started at 05:00 on 8 February. However, once the Canadians had advanced, the Germans opened the sluice gates of upstream dams (Rur Dam and Urft Dam). This stopped the Americans from crossing as planned. It had been anticipated that the Germans would try to do this, and that General Omar Bradley's U.S. 12th Army Group could capture them in time to stop the flooding.

During the two weeks that the river was flooded, Hitler would not allow Generalfeldmarschall Gerd von Rundstedt to withdraw behind the Rhine, arguing that it would only delay the inevitable fight. He ordered him to fight where his forces stood. Those forces comprised the 15th Army, commanded by Gustav-Adolf von Zangen, and the 1st Parachute Army, commanded by Alfred Schlemm. 

The Ninth Army was finally able to cross the river on 23 February. By then, other Allied forces were also close to the Rhine. German forces west of the Rhine during operations Veritable, Blockbuster and Grenade lost 90,000 men, of which more than 50,000 became prisoners of war (POW). Allied casualties amounted to some 23,000 men.

Notes
Footnotes

Citations

References

External links
https://web.archive.org/web/20101119074119/http://104infdiv.org/grenade.htm
From the Rur to the Elbe (pdf, 92 pages) 
https://web.archive.org/web/20060629050112/http://www-cgsc.army.mil/carl/download/csipubs/fromroer/from_cii.pdf (PDF)

Grenade
Rhine Province
February 1945 events in Europe
1945 in military history
1945 in Germany